Mike Jon Verchio (born October 23, 1944 in Boone, Iowa) is an American politician and a Republican member of the South Dakota House of Representatives representing District 30 since January 2009.

Elections
2012 Verchio and fellow incumbent Republican Representative Lance Russell were challenged in the five-way June 5, 2012 Republican Primary where Verchio placed first with 1,716 votes (30.1%); Verchio and Representative Russell were unopposed for the November 6, 2012 General election, where Verchio took the first seat with 7,737 votes (54.4%) and Representative Russell took the second seat.
2008 When District 30 incumbent Republican Representatives Gordon Howie and Gordon Pederson both ran for South Dakota Senate and left both District 30 seats open, Verchio ran in the five-way June 3, 2008 Republican Primary and placed second with 1,240 votes (20.2%) ahead of former state Representative Dick Brown, who placed third; in the four-way November 4, 2008 General election Verchio took the first seat with 7,551 votes (35.3%) and fellow Republican nominee Lance Russell took the second seat ahead of Democratic nominees Kathleen Ann and Jacqueline Gerenz.
2010 Verchio and incumbent Representative Russell were unopposed for the June 8, 2010 Republican Primary and won the three-way November 2, 2010 General election, where Verchio took the first seat with 7,439 votes (44.1%) and Representative Russell took the second seat ahead of returning 2008 Democratic nominee Kathleen Ann.

Legislative Activity
2016 Verchio proposed House Bill 1073, which in some circumstances would require cyclists to pull over and allow cars to pass. Specifically, "If a person is operating a bicycle within a no passing zone on a roadway that has no shoulder or a shoulder of less than three feet in width, the person shall stop the bicycle, move the bicycle off the roadway, and allow a faster vehicle to pass." The website MomentumMag.com called this bill "...probably the most blatant attempt one could make at getting cyclists off of the roads short of straight-up making bicycles illegal."

References

External links
Official page at the South Dakota Legislature
Campaign site
 

1944 births
Living people
Republican Party members of the South Dakota House of Representatives
People from Boone, Iowa
People from Hill City, South Dakota
21st-century American politicians